The Crypt Lake Trail is one of the premium hikes in Waterton Lakes National Park in Alberta, Canada. It is accessed by a dedicated ferry service operating from the Waterton Park Townsite.

The first part of the trail offers the choice of two alternate routes for ascent and return running through forest, the longer of which passes the impressive Hellroaring Falls. After that the trail becomes an open walk through a valley crossing small mountain streams and leading up to the views of Crypt Falls. The last part of the trail is the ascent to Crypt Lake. This part is more challenging; in parts the walk runs at the edge of steep drops, secured by cable and also involves crawling through a narrow, but short, tunnel. Finally the trail reaches the shores of Crypt Lake through a small forest.

Crypt Lake
Crypt Lake is a pristine alpine lake occupying a cirque that often has ice into August. Most of the area around the lake is covered in scree and/or snow, and hiking around the circumference of the lake requires approximately 45 minutes. Wildlife can be spotted in the mountains towering above including mountain goat and bighorn sheep. From Crypt Lake it is only a short walk to the edge of Crypt Falls with views over the valley below.

Hiking
The Crypt Lake Hike was voted "Canada's Best Hike" in 1981. The hike is accessed via the local ferry service, and begins with a gradual climb through shaded forests. As visitors progress into the hanging valley, the forest begins to thin out, and the strenuous section of the hike begins. Immediately after Burnt Rock Falls, the hike steadily climbs up onto the open alpine mountain side. This section of the hike, offers views of the Crypt Valley as well as that of the cascading Crypt Falls. After hiking along the mountain side, hikers arrive at the Crypt Lake Campground. This camping area was provided for overnight backpackers and was equipped with an outhouse and fireplace. However, the campground is now permanently closed and is no longer equipped with a fireplace. After continuing over the alpine creek adjacent to the campground, hikers follow the trail towards the ledge and tunnel. This section of the hike involves a scramble along a sheer cliff, with the assistance of a steel cable. After the scramble, the route passes through a shaded forest before arriving at Crypt Lake. The hike is a total of  round trip, with a gradual  elevation gain.

However, there is no border-related signage or warnings, and no legal consequences for hikers, as entry any further into the United States at this location is impossible due to sheer mountain cliffs at the south end of the lake.

Wildlife
The slopes along the Crypt Lake Trail serve as primary bear country. Both grizzly bear and black bear can be seen on this trail. It is important to check with the visitor information centre and/or ferry service regarding recent bear sightings on the trail. Other large mammal species that call the Crypt Valley home include bighorn sheep, moose, mountain goat, mule deer and white-tailed deer. It is not uncommon to see striped or least chipmunk frequenting the trail, as well as other rodent species, such as hoary marmot, yellow-bellied marmot, red squirrel and Richardson's ground squirrel. Crypt Lake itself is stocked with cutthroat trout and is one of several destinations for local fishermen in the park.

Ferry service
Ferry service from the Waterton townsite brings hikers to the trail head twice in the morning and returns to pick them up, twice in the late afternoon (off of peak season [May–June, Sept-Oct], ferry services only make 1 round trip per day.) The time span is reasonable to perform the whole trail, but it's always a good idea to keep an eye on the time. There is no potable drinking water provided at the trail head (ferry landing site) or anywhere along the trail. There is an outhouse at the start of the trail where the ferry docks, and near the top of the trail at the designated campground before crossing to the cave entrance, however hikers are advised to bring their own toilet paper.

References

External links
Parks Canada: Crypt Lake Trail
Waterton Park Information Services: Crypt Lake Trail
Detailed Review of Crypt Lake Trail
Crypt Falls, Rocky Mountain perfection! - Secret World

Hiking trails in Alberta
Waterton Lakes National Park
Lakes of Alberta
Canada–United States border